The Ottoman–Portuguese Conflicts (1586–1589) were armed military engagements which took place between the Portuguese Empire and the Ottoman Empire  along the coast of eastern Africa. The conflict resulted from the expansion of the Portuguese Empire into territory controlled by the Adal Sultanate.

Expedition of Mir Ali Beg to East Africa, 1586

In January 1586, a Turkish privateer named Mir Ali Beg sailed from Mocha in Yemen to the Horn of Africa, intending to disrupt Portuguese shipping in the region. He began informing the Sultan that the naval forces of the Ottoman Empire in the Indian Ocean were unable to protect against Portuguese expansion. Consequently, Sultan Murad III sent Mir Ali down with two other ships that were tasked with defending the Swahili coast.  Additionally, Mir Ali Beg convinced the inhabitants of Mogadishu to rebel against the Portuguese, and thus was joined by a few local vessels in support of his endeavors. The people of Barawa and Faza also declared their allegiance to the Ottoman Empire and, in the end, Mir Ali Beg had about 15 vessels.  At Pate, Mir Ali Beg captured a Portuguese merchant carrack. At Lamu, Mir Ali Beg captured a small galley belonging to Roque de Brito Falcão, while the king of Lamu delivered his city's Portuguese refugees to the Turks. Mir Ali Beg also established a fort at Mombasa.

Setting sail back to Mocha, Mir Ali Beg captured another Portuguese carrack in Pate that had just arrived from Chaul, promising their passengers their freedom in exchange for their cargo—a promise which Mir Ali Beg did not keep, resulting in the passengers' enslavement. Mir Ali Beg returned to Mocha with about 20 vessels and 100 Portuguese refugees, who were later ransomed.

Expedition of Ruy Gonçalves da Câmara to the Red Sea, 1586

In the fall of 1585 the Portuguese dispatched a fleet to south Arabia with instructions to attack Muslim shipping. This was led by Ruy Gonçalves da Câmara and was the first serious attempt by the Portuguese to restrict access to the Red Sea in more than a decade. Furthermore, the fleet, numbering 26 vessels was one of the largest naval force sent to the region by the Portuguese.

While anchored at a bay 30 miles south of Mocha Rui Gonçalves landed a scouting party of 70 men to fetch water for the fleet, but it was attacked by a force of 2000 Turkish horsemen from Mocha and forced to reembark the following day, having suffered five or six dead, The Portuguese lost one of their own Vessels in the campaign. This was later reported by Ottoman authorities as a major victory.

Despite the numerical strength of the Portuguese fleet, Ruy Gonçalves da Câmara failed to catch any ship in four months and withdrew to Muscat afflicted by thirst in 1586.

East African campaign, 1587

When news reached Goa that a Turkish fleet was in East Africa inciting cities to rebel and raid Portuguese ships with Ottoman support, the Portuguese reacted swiftly. In January 1587, the Portuguese viceroy, Dom Duarte de Meneses, dispatched a fleet of 2 galleons, 3 galleys, 13 light-galleys, and 650 soldiers under the command of Martim Afonso de Melo to expel the Turks and reestablish Portuguese authority along the coast.

The King of Faza mobilized 4000 warriors but he was killed in action and the city sacked. Pate resubmitted. An indemnity of 4,000 cruzados was extracted from Mombasa in exchange for not destroying the city. At the same time, de Melo arrived at Malindi, whose king had remained loyal to the Portuguese, and reinforced their diplomatic ties.

Ultimately finding no sign of Mir Ali Beg, the Portuguese fleet returned to Goa via Socotra and Ormus.

Expedition of Mir Ali Beg to East Africa, 1588

In the summer of 1588, Mir Ali Beg set sail from Mocha with a fleet of 5 oarships. Calling first at Mogadishu, Mir Ali Beg now extracted a heavy tribute from the cities along the coast in exchange for protection, in the name of the Ottoman Empire. From there he proceeded to Malindi, a loyal vassal of the Portuguese, hoping to sack it.

However, the Portuguese captain of the east-African coast Mateus Mendes de Vasconcelos, was at Malindi with a small force, and was already well aware of the approach of Mir Ali Beg: a network of spies and informants within the Red Sea itself kept the Portuguese up to date on Turkish movements. Approaching Malindi by night, the flotilla of Mir Ali Beg was bombarded by a Portuguese artillery battery, and so it sailed away to Mombasa.

Portuguese campaign to East-Africa 1589
Before Mir Ali Beg had even set sail, already Vasconcelos had dispatched a vessel to Goa informing the viceroy that the Turks were about to leave the Red Sea.

From India, governor Manuel de Sousa Coutinho dispatched an armada of 2 galleons, 5 galleys, 6 half-galleys, and 6 light-galleys with 900 Portuguese soldiers, commanded by his brother Tomé de Sousa Coutinho. In late February 1589 the fleet reached the east-African coast, and calling at Lamu, they learnt from an envoy of de Vasconcelos that Mir Ali Beg had established a stronghold at Mombasa. At Malindi, they were joined by de Vasconcelos with another half-galley and two light-galleys from Malindi.

Battle of Mombasa

On March 5, the Portuguese fleet reached the island of Mombasa. Mir Ali Beg had erected a small fort by the shoreline, close to the city, and armed it with artillery pieces to close off the entrance to the harbor. Nonetheless, the Portuguese pushed through under fire. Three Turkish galleys in the harbor were captured, the fort was bombarded from the sea by the galleys, and in face of superior firepower, the Turks abandoned the fort. The Portuguese captured 30 guns in this action, while 70 Turks perished. On March 7, the Portuguese landed 500 troops, only to learn that Mombasa had been evacuated, and its inhabitants had taken shelter in a nearby wood, along with the Turks.

At that time, by pure chance, a marauding cannibalistic tribe called the Zimbas was migrating north and had set up a camp just across the channel.  The last two of Mir Ali Beg's galleys prevented them from crossing onto the island. They were attacked and captured by the Portuguese. Wishing to capture Mir Ali Beg and the rest of the Turks, de Sousa Coutinho gave permission to the Zimbas to cross over - once the people of Mombasa realized the Zimbas had invaded the island, they promptly rushed to the beaches in desperation to be taken aboard the ships. Many drowned, but among the people the Portuguese captured was Mir Ali Beg.

Aftermath

On March 24, the Portuguese fleet reached Malindi, where they were triumphantly met with celebrations and long festivities.

With Mir Ali Beg captured, all that remained was to reestablish Portuguese suzerainty over the entire coast, through diplomacy or force of arms. The King of Malindi was amply rewarded for his valiant loyalty to the Portuguese Crown. The Portuguese captain of the East African coast, Mateus Mendes de Vasconcelos, was detached with a squadron to remain at Malindi and defend it from the marauding Zimbas. The King of Pemba, who was loyal to the Portuguese but was ousted by Ottoman-backed rebels, was reestablished on his throne. The King of Lamu, on the other hand, was captured and publicly beheaded. Pate was sacked.

Mir Ali Beg was taken prisoner, but treated with honor and sent to meet Dom de Sousa Coutinho, the Portuguese viceroy of India. Later he was sent to Portugal where he converted to Christianity.

Analyzing the conflict in detail, Czech historian Svat Soucek argued against the exaggeration of the capacity of the Ottoman Empire to expand their influence in the Indian Ocean by certain authors: Mir Ali Beg only managed to pass undetected by the Portuguese intelligence network due to the insignificance of his initial single galley; once he was detected, a Portuguese war fleet was swiftly dispatched to neutralize the threat.

The Swahili coast remained well within the Portuguese sphere of influence until the late 17th century.

Without Portuguese intervention in these skirmishes along the Horn of Africa, the Ottoman Empire's hold on the region might have tightened dramatically.

See also
Abyssinian-Adal War
Swahili Coast
History of Portugal
History of the Ottoman Empire
Military history of Portugal
Military of the Ottoman Empire
Ottoman–Portuguese conflicts (1538–1560)

Notes

References 
Attila and Balázs Weiszhár: Lexicon of War (Háborúk lexikona), Athenaum publisher, Budapest 2004.
Britannica Hungarica, Hungarian encyclopedia, Hungarian World publisher, Budapest 1994.
Dejanirah Couto, Rui Loureiro, Revisiting Hormuz: Portuguese Interactions in the Persian Gulf Region in the Early Modern Period (2008) 

1580s conflicts
Wars involving Portugal
Wars involving the Ottoman Empire
Military history of Africa
Military history of India
Wars involving Kenya
Wars involving Somalia
Ajuran Sultanate
1580s in Portugal
Ottoman–Portuguese conflicts
1580s in the Ottoman Empire
1580s in Africa
East Africa